Beyond Eden is also the title of a science fiction novel by David Duncan (writer).

Beyond Eden is a musical written by Bruce Ruddell with music by Bruce Ruddell and Bill Henderson. It premiered February 16, 2010 at the Max Bell Theatre at the Epcor Centre for the Performing Arts in Calgary, Alberta, Canada and in Vancouver at the Vancouver Playhouse as part of the Cultural Olympiad. The show was first mounted by Theatre Calgary and ran until March 7, 2010. The Vancouver show ran from January 16 to February 6, 2010 and was well received for its cast, musical score and background projections.

Beyond Eden is a fictional story inspired by the real life of Wilson Duff (1925–1976), a curator of anthropology at the British Columbia Provincial Museum, and his attempts to preserve Haida totem poles on the coast of British Columbia. The Calgary and Vancouver shows starred actor/musicians Tom Jackson and John Mann.

Synopsis

Act I
It is 1957. The play opens with the song, "Behind the Mask", where Lewis Wilson is having a conversation with The Watchman about Haida masks. Watchmen were men on duty around the village whose job it was to protect from invaders. He tells Lewis a story about the Raven and the Eagle, who are on the beach when the white man approaches the coast for the first time. The Watchman speaks of a gift that he "gave" Lewis – a mask with its eyes closed because it is looking inward. Lewis learns that the mask has a twin, with its eyes open.

We then see a crew loading a ship to leave port (Hecate's Fist). The men have been hired to travel to Haida Gwaii and Kitwancool to cut down and transport several Haida totem poles for preservation at a museum. Lewis and his friend, Max Tomson, a photographer who is half Haida, are excited about their trip and Lewis jokes with him to keep the pictures in focus this time. Among the crew are Clive and Gregory, who work for the museum and are glad to be out on the expedition. Two "Indian" guides have been hired to accompany the crew, Victor Duncan and Joe Duncan (nicknamed "Stinky"), and Joe clearly has reservations about the trip. We also meet Lewis' wife, Sal Wilson, and son, Jack Wilson. Sal has convinced Lewis to take her and Jack along on this expedition as he has been dedicated to his work, sometimes staying out all night long. We learn that Jack is estranged from his father and is a little awkward around people. We also learn that he has a crush on a girl at a local store but is unsure how to introduce himself to her ("Howa Baby"). The crew gives him advice and teaches him a few Haida phrases. Sal and Lewis have a touching moment on the deck (Ribbons of Light) when they hear that a storm has been reported. Although it seems clear on the water where they are sailing, Lewis encourages Sal to go under deck.

Lewis and the crew reflect on their expedition (Mystery). Max sings about his two worlds as half Haida, half European ("Disconnection"). A group of Haida women appear in a vision to Max ("The Spirit Song"). Max suddenly notices that Joe and Victor are acting suspicious. He confronts them and discovers that they were going to escape from the vessel by stealing the life raft. He attempts to wrestle them from the area and they resist. A fight breaks out and Lewis comes from below deck to discover the confusion as the storm breaks out ("No Contact"). The first act ends.

Act II
The crew is now landed in the forest near the Haida totem poles ("Beyond Eden"). They are wet and tired from their adventure on the water the previous evening, but credit Joe and Victor for saving their lives and getting them beyond the reefs. Victor acknowledges that the crew saved his and Joe's lives by refusing to let them get off the ship on the life raft. The men prepare for their various duties ("Ninstints").

Lewis becomes increasingly obsessed with the two masks and The Watchman visits him once again, continuing the Raven and Eagle story that he began telling in Act I. He credits Lewis for coming this far but tells him that he cannot let Lewis remove the poles. Lewis discovers that the two masks are meant to go together; one nests inside the other. Sal is worried about Lewis becoming more distant ("Beyond Eden Reprise"). Max reflects on the carvings on the totem poles ("Carving") and the vision of the Haida women appear to him again ("The Spirit Song"). As the men are about to cut down the totem poles, Lewis returns from being out all night and refuses to allow them to complete their work; he has changed his opinion about removing the poles based on his discussion with The Watchman. They discover that the chain saws are too wet to start and get axes to chop down the poles. A fight breaks out as Lewis attempts to oppose Clive and they struggle for the axe. Lewis begs Max to "back him up" but Max steadfastly refuses to turn back because he believes that he is finally appreciating his Haida heritage. Lewis finally grabs an axe and begins wildly chopping down the poles until the crew overpowers him and begin cutting down the poles themselves.

The second act ends as the totem poles are falling ("We Go On").

Original Cast

Bill Henderson, musical director
Bill Sample, piano and band leader
Adrian Dolan, viola
Dave Corman, guitar
Laurence Mollerup, bass
Randal Stoll, drums and percussion

Musical Numbers
The music for Beyond Eden was written by Bill Henderson and Bruce Ruddell, with Haida-inspired music written by Gwaai Edenshaw. Bruce Ruddell had been considering the story of the Haida Gwaii totem poles for around 30 years, beginning as an oratorio, then a 90-minute composition, before it ended up in its current incarnation as a musical.

Act I
Behind the Mask – Lewis, Ensemble
Hecate's Fist – Clive, Gregory, Ensemble
Howa Baby – Jack
Ribbons of Light – Sal, Lewis
Mystery – Lewis, Ensemble
Disconnection – Max, Ensemble
The Spirit Song – Haid Woman
No Contact – Full Company

Act II
Beyond Eden – Lewis, Ensemble
Ninstints – Clive, Gregory, Victor, Joe, Lewis, Ensemble
Beyond Eden Reprise – Sal
Carving – Max, Ensemble
The Spirit Song – Haida Woman
Waiting for Me – Lewis
War Song – Haida Woman
The Watchman's Song – The Watchman
I Hear You Call My Name – Sal
We Go On – Ensemble

References

External links
 Theatre Calgary Website
 Theatre Calgary's Beyond Eden Page
 Vancouver Playhouse Theatre Company's Beyond Eden Page

Canadian musicals
2010 musicals
Rock musicals
First Nations theatre